The Groans of the Britons is the final appeal made between 446 and 454 by the Britons to the Roman military for assistance against Pict and Scot raiders. The appeal is first referenced in Gildas' 6th-century De Excidio et Conquestu Britanniae; Gildas' account was later repeated in chapter 13 of Bede's Historia ecclesiastica gentis Anglorum. According to Gildas, the message was addressed to "Agitius", who is generally identified with the general Flavius Aetius. The collapsing Western Roman Empire had few military resources to spare during its decline, and the record is ambiguous on what the response to the appeal was, if any. According to Gildas and various later medieval sources, the failure of the Roman armies to secure Britain led the Britons to invite Anglo-Saxon mercenaries to the island, precipitating the Anglo-Saxon settlement of Britain.

Message
The message is recorded by Gildas in his De Excidio et Conquestu Britanniae, written in the second quarter of the sixth century and much later repeated by Bede. According to these sources, it was a last-ditch plea to "Agitius" for assistance. Agitius is generally identified as Aetius,  of the Western Roman Empire who spent most of the 440s fighting insurgents in Gaul and Hispania. The Roman Britons had been beset by raids by the Picts and Scots from northern Britain, who were able to pillage far to the south after the Roman armies had withdrawn from the island in 407.

The text describes Agitius as being consul for the third time, dating the message to the period between 446, when he held his third consulate, and 454, when he held his fourth. Leslie Alcock has raised a tentative possibility of the "Agitius" to whom the gemitus is directed actually being Aegidius—though he was never consul. This identification was supported by Stephen Johnson, but rejected by J. N. L. Myres. Miller left the possibility open. The usurper Constantine III had taken the last Roman troops from Britain in 407 and the civilian administration had been expelled by the natives a little later, leaving the inhabitants to fend for themselves during increasingly fraught times. Parts of the plea were recorded: 

The Romans, however, could not assist them, so the Britons were left to their own devices.

Problems of interpretation
A second visit in around 446–7 by Germanus, a former Roman general who had become Bishop of Auxerre, recorded in his Vita by Constantius of Lyon, could have reflected Aetius' response to the message.

The reference to Aetius' third consulship (446) is useful in dating the increasing strife in Britain during this period. Gildas' mention of the appeal is a minor part of a much larger religious polemic, however, which means that the image described may be more hyperbolic than realistic, especially as his sources were probably derived from oral tradition. The traditional picture of Romano-British society in post-Roman Britain as besieged and chaotic is also being increasingly challenged by archaeological evidence. Though that revisionist thought is once again being challenged by the evidence, which again indicates a definitive series of migrations into England on the part of the Saxons.  

The viewpoint of Gildas is coloured by his classicizing rather than monastic education, based at some remove on the Roman education of a rhetor, a source of his elaborated and difficult Latin.

Gildas' narrative describes the Britons as being too impious and plagued by infighting to fend off the Picts and Scots. They managed some successes against the invaders when they placed their faith in God's hands, but they were usually left to suffer greatly. Gildas mentions a "proud tyrant" who Bede names as Vortigern as the person who originally invited Germanic mercenaries to defend the borders, but the identification of this actual historical person has not yet established, so the actual dating of the start of Saxon foederati presence in Britain is still contentious.  Archaeology increasingly confirms Germanic presence before the Romans withdrew.  

Archaeological evidence supports some Germanic communities being in place in England before the 440s. The rebellion of Carausius in late 286 or early 287 and his recruitment of Frisian and Frankish foederati to man the Saxon Shore, for example, fits the myth of Vortigern quite well, including his betrayal and death. If it is true that Saxons were foederati allied with the Romano-British who stayed when the legions left, then the Battle of Badon Hill may have actually been fought in the northwest of England between Scots invaders from Ireland and British-Saxon defenders.

What is clear is that, ultimately, there was an increasing Anglo-Saxon settlement of Britain in the fifth and sixth centuries and increasing Anglo-Saxon culture, including language.

See also
End of Roman rule in Britain
Battle of Mons Badonicus
Sub-Roman Britain
Gododdin
Kingdom of Gwent
Wessex

Notes

References 
De Excidio Britannae, as translated by John Allen Giles
Bede
Mummy, Kevin, "The Groans of the Britons: Toward the British Civitates Period ca. 406-455 C.E.", Ex Post Facto: Journal of the History Students at San Francisco State University, 2002
Rosenbaum, Sabin, [https://www.academia.edu/3091466/The_Gemitus_Britannorum "The Gemitus Britannorum, A Restoration and English Translation of De Excidio, Chapters 19-25"
1615 books
Latin prose texts
5th century in England
446
Conflict in Anglo-Saxon England
440s
5th-century works
440s in the Roman Empire
Sub-Roman Britain
Flavius Aetius